The Lichfield Canal, as it is now known, was historically a part of the Wyrley and Essington Canal, being the section of that canal from Ogley Junction at Brownhills on the northern Birmingham Canal Navigations to Huddlesford Junction, east of Lichfield, on the Coventry Canal, a length of 7 miles (11.3 km). The branch was abandoned in 1955, along with several other branches of the Wyrley and Essington, and much of it was filled in.

Restoration plans were first voiced in 1975, and since 1990, the Lichfield and Hatherton Canals Restoration Trust have been actively engaged in excavating and rebuilding sections of the canal as they have become available. Major projects have included an isolated aqueduct over the M6 Toll motorway, ready for when the canal reaches it.

History
The Wyrley and Essington Canal was built under an Act of Parliament passed on 30 April 1792, for a canal which would run from Horseley Junction near Wolverhampton to Sneyd Junction, near Bloxwich. The main line would be level, following the  contour. From this junction, a branch would run to Wyrley Bank and on to Essington, which would include nine locks, and another level branch would run to Birchills, near Walsall. In 1794, the company obtained a second act, which authorised a long extension from Birchills to Brownhills, again on the level, but then descending through 30 locks to reach Huddlesford Junction, on the Birmingham and Fazeley Canal near Lichfield. The whole canal was opened on 9 May 1797, although there were problems with inadequate water supply, which were not resolved until 1800, with the building of Cannock Chase reservoir.

Although not prosperous, the company made enough profit to start paying dividends, which eventually rose to 6 per cent in 1825. The price of coal in Lichfield dropped considerably, due to the benefits of cheap transport. Following an agreement reached on 9 February 1840, the whole canal became part of the Birmingham Canal Navigations from April of that year. Under the terms of an Act of Abandonment obtained in 1954, most of the branches of the original Wyrley and Essington Canal were closed, including the branch from Ogley to Huddlesford, which was abandoned in 1955. Much of the bed was subsequently filled in, although a short section at Huddlesford Junction remains in use as moorings. The branch has subsequently been named the Lichfield Canal, while Huddlesford Junction is now considered to be on the Coventry Canal.

Restoration

Plans to restore the Lichfield Canal were first raised in 1975, when area planning authorities were required to produce county structure plans. The Inland Waterways Association (IWA) encouraged all members to ensure that local waterways were properly noted in the structure plans. Ideas for the restoration were put before the West Midlands planning team. Although the scheme was deemed to be unviable, interest in restoration continued, and the Lichfield and Hatherton Canals Restoration Trust (LHCRT) was formed to promote the restoration of the Lichfield Canal and the Hatherton Canal. Lichfield District Council allowed the Trust to start work on a half-mile (0.8 km) section near Fosseway Lane in 1990. In 1993, the Trust published detailed plans for the Ogley Locks Branch, now formally branded the "Lichfield Canal".

All  of the canal are within the jurisdiction of Lichfield District Council. The Trust began working on three main sites, as they became available. The first site was the half mile at Fossway Lane, bounded by locks 18 and 19, which was owned by the council. The second was at Darnford Lane, on either side of lock 29, which was bought by the council in 1995, using a Derelict Land Grant. The third was at Tamworth Road, covering locks 24 to 26. The upper two have been largely restored, while lock 24 was excavated to assess its condition, but was filled in again to conserve it, pending a decision on how the canal will cross Cricket Lane, immediately upstream from the lock. This whole area has been landscaped, and designated the Borrowcop Locks Canal Park.

Restoration was threatened by the construction of the M6 Toll motorway around the north of Birmingham, which cut across the canal's route. The Inspector heading the enquiry for the Northern Relief Road ruled that the contractor would only be responsible for the footings for a new aqueduct to carry the canal over the motorway, and that the Trust would need to raise the costs for the rest of the structure. An appeal was launched for funds, headed by the actor David Suchet, and together with a grant of £250,000 from the Manifold Trust, the £450,000 cost was met, the road contractors built the supporting columns, and on 16 August 2003, a steel trough was craned into position, having been pre-fabricated by Rowecord Engineering, who are based in South Wales. (The aqueduct has been finished but the canal has yet to reach it, giving it an odd appearance). This had a beneficial side-effect – the Government promised that never again would a new road be built in the path of a waterway restoration scheme, unless an aqueduct or tunnel was provided.

A new bridge taking Cappers Lane over the canal near Whittington was opened on 21 April 2006.

By August 2010, most of the work on a by-wash for lock 25, adjacent to the Borrowcop Locks Canal Park, had been carried out by members of the Restoration Trust, with help from the Waterways Recovery Group during weekend visits to Lichfield. The canal between Lock 25 and 26 was filled with water in April 2011, the first part of the canal to be filled with water since restoration works started.

Route

See also

Lichfield
Canals of Great Britain
History of the British canal system
Lichfield Canal Aqueduct
Hatherton Canal

Bibliography

References

External links
 Lichfield Canal
 Lichfield and Hatherton Canals Restoration Trust

Lichfield
Canals in Staffordshire
Birmingham Canal Navigations
Canals opened in 1797